NEM or Nem or nem or variation, may refer to:

Economics
 National Electricity Market, an eastern Australian interstate wholesale electricity market with high voltage interconnectors
 Net energy metering, an electricity billing mechanism
 Networked and Electronic Media, a European industrial initiative
 New Economic Mechanism, economic reforms undertaken in Hungary in 1968 and in Laos in 1986
 New Economic Model, an initiative to reform Malaysia's economy

Places
 New Malden railway station (National Rail station code NEM), London, England, UK 
 Nemom railway station (station code NEM), Kerala, India

People
 Nem (footballer, born 1973) (Rinaldo Francisco de Lima), Brazilian footballer
 Nem (footballer, born 1987) (Rogisvaldo João dos Santos), Brazilian footballer
 Wellington Nem (born 1992) (Wellington Silva Sanches Aguiar), Brazilian footballer
 Nem (singer), of Dude 'n Nem hiphop duo
 So Nem, Cambodian education minister

Groups, organizations, companies
 Newmont (NYSE symbol NEM), a US gold mining company
 Nouvel Ensemble Moderne, a chamber orchestra from Montreal, Canada
 National Equality March, a 2009 LGBT rights protest in Washington, DC, US
 National Electronics Museum, Linthicum, Maryland, USA

Other uses
 Nem, a Vietnamese dish
 Normen Europäischer Modellbahnen, the European standards for model railroads issued by the MOROP
 N-Ethylmaleimide, an organic compound
 Nemi language (ISO 639 language code nem)
 Russian Science Power Module (NEM), a cancelled International Space Station module; see Assembly of the International Space Station
 Russian Science Power Module (NEM), a module for the proposed space station Russian Orbital Service Station

See also